Matija Pintarič (born August 11, 1989) is a Slovenian ice hockey goaltender playing for Dragons de Rouen of the Ligue Magnus. He participated at the 2011 IIHF World Championship as a member of the Slovenia men's national ice hockey team.

Pintaric is a three-time winner (2017, 2019, 2020) of the Jean Ferrand Trophy awarded to the best goaltender in the French Ligue Magnus. He was also voted best goaltender of the Champions Hockey League group stage in 2018 and 2021.

References

External links
Profile at SiOL portal

1989 births
Living people
Beibarys Atyrau players
Dragons de Rouen players
Ducs de Dijon players
LHC Les Lions players
HDK Maribor players
HDD Olimpija Ljubljana players
Olofströms IK players
Slovenian ice hockey goaltenders
Sportspeople from Maribor
HK Olimpija players
Slovenian expatriate ice hockey people
Slovenian expatriate sportspeople in Kazakhstan
Slovenian expatriate sportspeople in France
Slovenian expatriate sportspeople in Sweden
Expatriate ice hockey players in Sweden
Expatriate ice hockey players in France
Expatriate ice hockey players in Kazakhstan